The 2022 Andalusian regional election was held on Sunday, 19 June 2022, to elect the 12th Parliament of the autonomous community of Andalusia. All 109 seats in the Parliament were up for election.

The 2018 election resulted in the first majority for right-of-centre parties in Andalusia in 36 years, paving the way for an alternative government to the Spanish Socialist Workers' Party of Andalusia (PSOE–A) despite the party remaining the most voted political force in the region. As a result, Juan Manuel Moreno of the People's Party (PP) unseated PSOE's Susana Díaz as regional president, forming a coalition with Citizens (Cs), with confidence and supply from the Vox party. A number of disagreements saw Vox withdraw its support from the PP–Cs government in May 2021 and reject its proposed 2022 budget in November. Concurrently, Susana Díaz was replaced as regional PSOE leader by Seville mayor Juan Espadas in June 2021.

The election saw a landslide victory for the PP under a low turnout, with incumbent president Moreno being re-elected. The PP won in all eight provinces in Andalusia, with Seville flipping from the PSOE to the PP for the first time in Spanish democracy. In total, the PP took 58 of the 109 seats in Parliament, an increase of 32 from their 2018 result and an absolute majority of seats that was the first in its history, while taking 43% of the vote (up 22 points from the last election). The PSOE, which for the first time in history contested a regional election in Andalusia from opposition, got its worst result ever in the autonomous community, while Vox failed to fulfil expectations and saw only modest gains. Support for Cs collapsed, with the party being left out of parliament, whereas the left-wing vote divided between the For Andalusia (PorA) and Forward Andalusia (Adelante Andalucía) platforms.

Overview

Electoral system
The Parliament of Andalusia was the devolved, unicameral legislature of the autonomous community of Andalusia, having legislative power in regional matters as defined by the Spanish Constitution of 1978 and the regional Statute of Autonomy, as well as the ability to vote confidence in or withdraw it from a regional president.

Voting for the Parliament was on the basis of universal suffrage, which comprised all nationals over 18 years of age, registered in Andalusia and in full enjoyment of their political rights. Additionally, Andalusians abroad were required to apply for voting before being permitted to vote, a system known as "begged" or expat vote. The 109 members of the Parliament of Andalusia were elected using the D'Hondt method and a closed list proportional representation, with an electoral threshold of three percent of valid votes—which included blank ballots—being applied in each constituency. Seats were allocated to constituencies, corresponding to the provinces of Almería, Cádiz, Córdoba, Granada, Huelva, Jaén, Málaga and Seville, with each being allocated an initial minimum of eight seats and the remaining 45 being distributed in proportion to their populations (provided that the number of seats in each province did not exceed two times that of any other).

As a result of the aforementioned allocation, each constituency was entitled the following seats for the 2022 regional election:

The use of the D'Hondt method might result in a higher effective threshold, depending on the district magnitude.

Election date
The term of the Parliament of Andalusia expired four years after the date of its previous election, unless it was dissolved earlier. The election decree was required to be issued no later than the twenty-fifth day prior to the date of expiry of parliament and published on the following day in the Official Gazette of the Regional Government of Andalusia (BOJA), with election day taking place on the fifty-fourth day from publication barring any date within from 1 July to 31 August. The previous election was held on 2 December 2018, which meant that the legislature's term would have expired on 2 December 2022. The election decree was required to be published in the BOJA no later than 8 November 2022, with the election taking place on the fifty-fourth day from publication, setting the latest possible election date for the Parliament on Sunday, 1 January 2023.

The president had the prerogative to dissolve the Parliament of Andalusia and call a snap election, provided that no motion of no confidence was in process and that dissolution did not occur before one year had elapsed since the previous one. In the event of an investiture process failing to elect a regional president within a two-month period from the first ballot, the Parliament was to be automatically dissolved and a fresh election called.

In the aftermath of the May 2021 border crisis between Morocco and Spain, Vox announced it would end its confidence and supply arrangement with the PP–Cs coalition government after it became known that the authorities had agreed to take custody of 13 unaccompanied minors from Ceuta. This made the prospect of a snap election likelier, coupled with speculation about an earlier election date following the gains achieved by the PP in the 2021 Madrilenian regional election at the expense of Cs. The Andalusian government initially responded by indicating a tentative date for the next election of Sunday, 27 November 2022, in order to dispel any rumours about the instability of the governing coalition.

In November 2021, and amid concerns that parliamentary negotiations would fail to deliver the 2022 budget due to opposition from both the PSOE–A and Vox, it was suggested that a snap election would be called for either 27 February or 6 March, coinciding with the festivities of Andalusia Day. Together with speculation on an early election in Castile and León to be held in the spring of 2022, it was initially suggested that the two elections could be held simultaneously. However, on 30 November 2021, several days after his budget for 2022 was voted down by the parliament, President Juan Manuel Moreno said that an early election would be held but that his will was to set the election date for either June or October 2022, which meant that a Castilian-Leonese snap election, widely expected to be called before 10 March and finally called for 13 February, would be held sooner. On 19 January, Juan Manuel Moreno announced that he would make up his mind about a snap election "throughout February", with an early dissolution that month bringing the regional election date to either April or May. However, following the PP and Vox's results in the Castilian-Leonese election and the rising prospects of a coalition government between the two in that region, members of Moreno's government acknowledged that a snap election before late in the year would now be unlikely, with the originally scheduled date of 27 November returning to the spotlight as one of the likeliest election dates.

The election of Alberto Núñez Feijóo as new national PP leader on 2 April 2022 in replacement of Pablo Casado sparked new rumours of a snap election in Andalusia, and on 24 April Juan Manuel Moreno announced that the regional election would be held before the summer. The next day, it was confirmed that the election would be held on 19 June.

Parliamentary composition
The Parliament of Andalusia was officially dissolved on 26 April 2022, after the publication of the dissolution decree in the Official Gazette of the Regional Government of Andalusia. The table below shows the composition of the parliamentary groups in the Parliament at the time of dissolution.

Parties and candidates
The electoral law allows for parties and federations registered in the interior ministry, coalitions and groupings of electors to present lists of candidates. Parties and federations intending to form a coalition ahead of an election are required to inform the relevant Electoral Commission within ten days of the election call, whereas groupings of electors need to secure the signature of at least one percent of the electorate in the constituencies for which they seek election, disallowing electors from signing for more than one list of candidates.

Below is a list of the main parties and electoral alliances which contested the election:

In September 2021, citizen collectives of the so-called "Empty Spain" ( or España Vaciada), a coined term to refer to Spain's rural and largely unpopulated interior provinces, agreed to look for formulas to contest the next elections in Spain, inspired by the success of the Teruel Existe candidacy (Spanish for "Teruel Exists") in the November 2019 Spanish general election. By March 2022, the platform had announced that it would contest the Andalusian election in at least the Granada and Jaén provinces. However, in May the platform ruled out a candidacy in Granada, and only filed candidates in Jaén within the platform Jaén Merece Más (Spanish for "Jaén Deserves More").

In light of the party's negative outlook in recent opinion polls, Citizens (Cs) did not rule out establishing an electoral alliance with the People's Party (PP) to ease the prospects for a renewal of their coalition government, with such possibility being suggested by both the national and regional leaders of the party, Inés Arrimadas and Juan Marín, on 4 December 2021. The PP's national leadership rejected this possibility in the following days, which contrasted with the regional branch of the party being willing to study a merger between the two parties ahead of a regional election.

In December 2021, Más País, Greens Equo, Andalusia by Herself (AxSí) and Andalusian People's Initiative (IdPA) had agreed in a common platform—dubbed as Andaluces Levantaos, "Arise, o Andalusians", a reference to the Andalusian anthem—to contest the election. On 2 February 2022, it was revealed that Podemos, United Left/The Greens–Assembly for Andalusia (IULV–CA), Adelante Andalucía and the Andaluces Levantaos's parties had started talks to probe a prospective electoral alliance of all various parties to the left-wing of the PSOE, in which each would retain a degree of autonomy in parliament, in order to prevent a severe vote dispersion that would deprive them of many seats. An early agreement was concluded in late March 2022, and by April 2022 that the new joint alliance of all these parties (with the exception of Adelante Andalucía and AxSí) would be named as Por Andalucía (Spanish for "For Andalusia"), for which Podemos suggested its Congress deputy Juan Antonio Delgado as the prospective candidate. In the end, an electoral alliance was agreed between Podemos, IULV–CA, Greens Equo, Green Alliance (AV), Más País and Andalusian People's Initiative (IdPA), but because Podemos and AV failed to fill the required documentation ahead of the legal deadline, both parties found themselves unable to be awarded full party rights within the coalition.

In May 2022, the town council in Salobreña in the province of Granada struck the name of Vox candidate Macarena Olona from its electoral roll after a recording emerged of former Vox Granada president Manuel Martín saying that she was registered at one of his properties without living there regularly or having a rental contract. She was still allowed to stand as a candidate by the province's electoral board. Olona reported the town's PSOE mayor, María Eugenia Rufino González, to the Guardia Civil for alleged abuse of office and deprivation of the right to vote.

Timetable
The key dates are listed below (all times are CET):

25 April: The election decree is issued with the countersign of the President.
26 April: Formal dissolution of the Parliament of Andalusia and beginning of a suspension period of events for the inauguration of public works, services or projects.
29 April: Initial constitution of provincial and zone electoral commissions.
6 May: Deadline for parties and federations intending to enter into a coalition to inform the relevant electoral commission.
16 May: Deadline for parties, federations, coalitions, and groupings of electors to present lists of candidates to the relevant electoral commission.
18 May: Submitted lists of candidates are provisionally published in the Official Gazette of the Regional Government of Andalusia (BOJA).
21 May: Deadline for citizens entered in the Register of Absent Electors Residing Abroad (CERA) and for citizens temporarily absent from Spain to apply for voting.
22 May: Deadline for parties, federations, coalitions, and groupings of electors to rectify irregularities in their lists.
23 May: Official proclamation of valid submitted lists of candidates.
24 May: Proclaimed lists are published in the BOJA.
3 June: Official start of electoral campaigning.
9 June: Deadline to apply for postal voting.
14 June: Official start of legal ban on electoral opinion polling publication, dissemination or reproduction and deadline for CERA citizens to vote by mail.
15 June: Deadline for postal and temporarily absent voters to issue their votes.
17 June: Last day of official electoral campaigning and deadline for CERA citizens to vote in a ballot box in the relevant consular office or division.
18 June: Official 24-hour ban on political campaigning prior to the general election (reflection day).
19 June: Polling day (polling stations open at 9 am and close at 8 pm or once voters present in a queue at/outside the polling station at 8 pm have cast their vote). Provisional counting of votes starts immediately.
22 June: General counting of votes, including the counting of CERA votes.
25 June: Deadline for the general counting of votes to be carried out by the relevant electoral commission.
4 July: Deadline for elected members to be proclaimed by the relevant electoral commission.
8 August: Final deadline for definitive results to be published in the BOJA.

Campaign

Party slogans

Leaders' debates

Opinion polls

Opinion polls
The tables below list opinion polling results in reverse chronological order, showing the most recent first and using the dates when the survey fieldwork was done, as opposed to the date of publication. Where the fieldwork dates are unknown, the date of publication is given instead. The highest percentage figure in each polling survey is displayed with its background shaded in the leading party's colour. If a tie ensues, this is applied to the figures with the highest percentages. The "Lead" column on the right shows the percentage-point difference between the parties with the highest percentages in a poll.

Graphical summary

Voting intention estimates
The table below lists weighted voting intention estimates. Refusals are generally excluded from the party vote percentages, while question wording and the treatment of "don't know" responses and those not intending to vote may vary between polling organisations. When available, seat projections determined by the polling organisations are also displayed below (or in place of) the voting estimates in a smaller font; 55 seats were required for an absolute majority in the Parliament of Andalusia.

Voting preferences
The table below lists raw, unweighted voting preferences.

Victory preferences
The table below lists opinion polling on the victory preferences for each party in the event of a regional election taking place.

Victory likelihood
The table below lists opinion polling on the perceived likelihood of victory for each party in the event of a regional election taking place.

Preferred President
The table below lists opinion polling on leader preferences to become president of the Regional Government of Andalusia.

Voter turnout
The table below shows registered vote turnout on election day without including voters from the Census of Absent-Residents (CERA).

Results

Overall

Distribution by constituency

Aftermath

The election resulted in a landslide victory for the People's Party (PP), with incumbent president Juan Manuel Moreno being re-elected. The PP won in all eight provinces in Andalusia, with the constituency of Seville flipping from the Spanish Socialist Workers' Party of Andalusia (PSOE–A) to the PP for the first time since the Spanish transition to democracy. In total, the PP took 58 of the 109 seats in parliament, an increase of 32 from their 2018 result and an absolute majority of seats that was the first in its history, while taking 43% of the vote, up 22 points from the last election. The PSOE—which, for the first time in history, was contesting a regional election in Andalusia from opposition—got its worst result ever in the autonomous community with 24.1% and 30 seats, being unable to recover from the 2018 shock which saw the party being expelled from the regional government of the community for the first time in 36 years.

The far-right Vox party failed to fulfil expectations and saw only modest gains, increasing its 2018 share by 2 points and gaining two additional seats, far short of the over 20 seats they had set themselves as a target. This was the first major electoral setback for the party since the 2019 general, regional, and local elections in Spain; in particular, the November 2019 general election had seen the party secure over 869,000 votes and 20.4% of the share, which was now reduced to 494,000 votes and 13.5%. Support for the liberal Citizens (Cs) collapsed as a result of vote transfers to the PP, whereas the left-wing vote of the 2018 Adelante Andalucía alliance divided between the United Left (IU) and Podemos-led For Andalusia coalition and the new Adelante Andalucía alliance of former Podemos regional leader Teresa Rodríguez.

Notes

References
Opinion poll sources

Other

2022 in Andalusia
Andalusia
Regional elections in Andalusia
June 2022 events in Spain